Chironomini is a tribe of midges in the non-biting midge family (Chironomidae).

Genera & species

Genus Apedilum Townes, 1945 
A. elachistus Townes, 1945
A. subcinctum Townes, 1945
Genus Axarus Roback 1980
A. dorneri (Malloch, 1915)
A. festivus Say, 1823
A. rogersi (Beck and Beck, 1958)
A. scopula (Townes, 1945)
A. taenionotus (Say, 1829)
Genus Baeotendipes Kieffer, 1913
B. noctivagus (Kieffer, 1911)
Genus Beardius Reiss & Sublette, 1985
B. truncatus Reiss & Sublette, 1985
Genus Beckidia Sæther 1979
B. biraensis Zorina, 2006
B. connexa Zorina, 2006
B. hirsti (Freeman, 1957)
B. tethys (Townes, 1945)
B. zabolotzkyi (Goetghebuer, 1938)
Genus Carbochironomus Reiss & Kirschbaum 1990
C. improvisus Reiss & Kirschbaum, 1990
Genus Chernovskiia Sæther 1977
C. macrocera Sæther, 1977
C. orbicus (Townes, 1945)
Genus Chironomus Meigen, 1803
Subgenus Camptochironomus Kieffer, 1918
C. pallidivittatus Edwards, 1929
C. tentans Fabricius, 1805
Subgenus Chaetolabis Townes 1945
C. globulus Philinkova & Belyanina, 1993
C. macani Freeman, 1948
Subgenus Chironomus Meigen, 1803
C. aberratus Keyl, 1961
C. acerbus Hirvenoja, 1962
C. acidophilus Keyl, 1960
C. acutiventris acutiventris Wülker, Ryser & Scholl, 1983
C. acutiventris bavaricus Wülker, Ryser & Scholl, 1983
C. acutiventris Wülker, Ryser & Scholl, 1983
C. agilis Shobanov & Dyomin, 1988
C. anchialicus Michailova, 1974
C. annularius Meigen, 1818
C. anthracinus Zetterstedt, 1860
C. aprilinus Meigen, 1818
C. balatonicus Dévai, Wülker & Scholl, 1983
C. beljaninae Wülker, 1991
C. bernensis Klötzli, 1973
C. bonus Shilova & Dzhvarsheishvili, 1974
C. borokensis Kerkis, Filippova, Shobanov, Gunderina & Kiknadze, 1988
C. brevidentatus Hirvenoja & Michailova, 1998
C. calipterus Kieffer, 1908
C. cingulatus Meigen, 1830
C. clarus Hirvenoja, 1962
C. coaetaneus Hirvenoja, 1998
C. commutatus Keyl, 1960
C. crassimanus Strenzke, 1959
C. curabilis Belyanina, Sigareva & Loginova, 1990
C. dorsalis Andersen, 1949
C. entis Shobanov, 1989
C. esai Wülker, 1997
C. fraternus Wülker, 1991
C. fundatus Philinkova & Belyanina, 1993
C. heterodentatus Konstantinov, 1956
C. heteropilicornis Wülker, 1996
C. holomelas Keyl, 1961
C. hyperboreus Stæger, 1845
C. inermifrons Goetghebuer, 1921
C. islandicus (Kieffer, 1913)
C. jonmartini Lindeberg, 1979
C. lacunarius Wülker, 1973
C. longistylus Goetghebuer, 1921
C. lugubris Zetterstedt, 1850
C. luridus Strenzke, 1959
C. melanescens Keyl, 1961
C. melanotus Keyl, 1961
C. muratensis Ryser, Scholl & Wülker, 1983
C. neocorax Wülker & Butler, 1983
C. nigrifrons Linevich & Erbaeva, 1971
C. nigrocaudatus Erbaeva, 1968
C. nuditarsis Keyl, 1961
C. nudiventris Ryser, Scholl & Wülker, 1983
C. obtusidens Goetghebuer, 1921
C. oculatus Shobanov, 1996
C. pankratovi Grebenyuk, Kiknadze & Belyanina, 1989
C. parathummi Keyl, 1961
C. piger Strenzke, 1956
C. pilicornis (Fabricius, 1787)
C. plumosus (Linnaeus, 1758)
C. prasinus Pinder, 1978
C. pseudothummi Strenzke, 1959
C. reservatus Shobanov, 1997
C. riihimakiensis Wülker, 1973
C. riparius Meigen, 1804
C. salinarius Kieffer, 1915
C. saxatilis Wülker, Ryser & Scholl, 1981
C. solitus Linevich & Erbaeva, 1971
C. sollicitus Hirvenoja, 1962
C. sororius Wülker, 1973
C. staegeri Lundbeck, 1898
C. strenzkei Fittkau, 1968
C. striatus Strenzke, 1959
C. tenuistylus Brundin, 1949
C. uliginosus Keyl, 1960
C. usenicus Loginova & Belyanina, 1994
C. valkanovi Michailova, 1974
C. venustus Pinder, 1978
C. wulkeri Philinkova & Belyanina, 1993
Subgenus Lobochironomus Ryser, Wülker & Scholl, 1985
C. carbonarius Meigen, 1804
C. dissidens Walker, 1856
C. dorsalis Meigen, 1818
C. improvidus Hirvenoja, 1998
C. mendax Storå, 1936
C. montuosus Ryser, Wülker & Scholl, 1985
C. pseudomendax Wülker, 1999
C. storai Goetghebuer, 1954
Genus Cladopelma Kieffer, 1921
C. amachaerus (Townes, 1945)
C. boydi (Beck, 1962)
C. collator (Townes, 1945)
C. edwardsi (Kruseman, 1933)
C. galeator (Townes, 1945)
C. spectabilis (Townes, 1945)
C. viridula (Linnaeus, 1767)
Genus Cryptochironomus Kieffer, 1918
C. albofasciatus (Stæger, 1839)
C. argus Roback, 1957
C. blarina (Townes, 1945)
C. chaetoala (Sublette, 1960)
C. crassiforceps Goetghebuer, 1932
C. defectus (Kieffer, 1913)
C. denticulatus (Goetghebuer, 1921)
C. digitatus (Malloch, 1915)
C. fulvus Johannsen, 1905
C. hirtalatus (Beck and Beck, 1964)
C. obreptans (Walker, 1856)
C. parafulvus (Beck and Beck, 1964)
C. ponderosus (Sublette, 1964)
C. psittacinus (Meigen, 1830)
C. psittacinus Meigen, 1830
C. redekei (Kruseman, 1933)
C. rostratus Kieffer, 1921
C. scimitarus Townes, 1945
C. sorex Townes, 1945
C. supplicans (Meigen, 1830)
C. ussouriensis (Goetghebuer, 1933)
Genus Cryptotendipes Lenz, 1941
C. ariel (Sublette, 1960)
C. casuarius (Townes, 1945)
C. darbyi (Sublette, 1960)
C. darbyi (Sublette, 1960)
C. emorsus (Townes, 1945)
C. holsatus Lenz, 1959
C. nigronitens (Edwards, 1929)
C. pflugfelderi Reiss, 1964
C. pilicuspis Sæther, 1977
C. pseudotener (Goetghebuer, 1922)
C. pseudotener Goethgebuer, 1922
C. usmaensis (Pagast, 1931)
Genus Cyphomella Sæther 1977
C. argentea (Townes, 1945)
C. cornea Sæther, 1977
C. gibbera Sæther, 1977
C. grisa (Malloch, 1915)
Genus Demeijerea Kruseman, 1933
D. abruptus (Townes, 1945)
D. brachialis (Coquillett, 1907)
D. obreptus (Townes, 1945)
D. rufipes (Linnaeus, 1761)
Genus Demicryptochironomus Lenz, 1941
D. cuneatus (Townes, 1945)
D. fastigatus (Townes, 1945)
D. latior Reiss, 1988
D. neglectus Reiss, 1988
D. vulneratus (Zetterstedt, 1838)
Genus Dicrotendipes Kieffer, 1913
D. adnilus  Epler, 1987 
D. aethiops (Townes, 1945)
D. botaurus (Townes, 1945)
D. californicus (Johannsen, 1905)
D. ealae (Freeman, 1957)
D. fumidus (Johannsen, 1905)
D. fusconotatus (Kieffer, 1922)
D. leucoscelis (Townes, 1945)
D. lobiger (Kieffer, 1921)
D. lobus Beck, 1962
D. lucifer (Johannsen, 1907)
D. milleri (Townes, 1945)
D. modestus (Say, 1823)
D. neomodestus (Malloch, 1915)
D. nervosus (Stæger, 1839)
D. notatus (Meigen, 1818)
D. pallidicornis (Goetghebuer, 1934)
D. peringueyanus Kieffer, 1924
D. pilosimanus Kieffer, 1914
D. pulsus (Walker, 1856)
D. septemmaculatus (Becker, 1908)
D. simpsoni Epler, 1987
D. sudanicus (Freeman, 1957)
D. thanatogratus Epler, 1987
D. tritomus (Kieffer, 1916)
Genus Einfeldia Kieffer, 1924
E. austini Beck & Beck, 1970
E. brunneipennis Johannsen, 1905
E. chelonia (Townes, 1945)
E. dissidens (Walker, 1856)
E. natchitocheae (Sublette, 1964)
E. pagana (Meigen, 1838)
E. natchitocheae (Sublette, 1964)
E. pagana (Meigen, 1838)
E. palaearctica Ashe, 1990
E. pectoralis Kieffer, 1924
Genus Endochironomus Kieffer, 1918
E. albipennis (Meigen, 1830)
E. nigricans (Johannsen, 1905)
E. oldenbergi Goetghebuer, 1932
E. stackelbergi Goetghebuer, 1935
E. subtendens (Townes, 1945)
E. tendens (Fabricius, 1775)
Genus Fleuria Kieffer, 1924
F. lacustris Kieffer, 1924
Genus Gillotia Kieffer, 1921
G. alboviridis (Malloch, 1915)
Genus Glyptotendipes Kieffer, 1913
G. aequalis (Kieffer, 1922)
G. amplus Townes, 1945
G. barbipes (Stæger, 1839)
G. caulicola (Kieffer, 1913)
G. cauliginellus (Kieffer, 1913)
G. dreisbachi Townes, 1945
G. foliicola Contreras-Lichtenberg, 1997
G. glaucus (Meigen, 1818)
G. gripekoveni (Kieffer, 1913)
G. imbecilis (Walker, 1856)
G. lobiferus (Say, 1823)
G. meridionalis Dendy and Sublette, 1959
G. ospeli Contreras-Lichtenberg & Kiknadze, 1999
G. pallens (Meigen, 1804)
G. paripes (Edwards, 1929)
G. salinus Michailova, 1987
G. scirpi (Kieffer, 1915)
G. seminole Townes, 1945
G. senilis (Johannsen, 1937)
G. signatus (Kieffer, 1909)
G. testaceus (Townes, 1945)
G. unacus Townes, 1945 
G. viridis (Macquart, 1834)
Genus Graceus Goetghebuer, 1928
G. ambiguus Goetghebuer 1928
Genus Harnischia Kieffer, 1921
H. angularis Albu & Botnariuc, 1966
H. curtilamellata (Malloch, 1915)
H. fuscimana Kieffer, 1921
H. incidata Townes, 1945
Genus Kiefferulus Goetghebuer, 1922
K. dux (Johannsen, 1905)
K. tendipediformis (Goetghebuer, 1921)
Genus Kloosia Kruseman 1933
K. pusilla (Linnaeus, 1761)
Genus Lauterborniella Thienemann & Bause, 1913
L. agrayloides (Kieffer, 1911)
L. varipennis (Coquillett, 1902)
Genus Lipiniella Shilova 1961
L. araenicola Shilova, 1961
L. moderata Kalugina, 1970
L. prima Shilova, Kerkis & Kiknadze, 1993
Genus Microchironomus Kieffer, 1918
M. deribae (Freeman, 1957)
M. lendli (Kieffer, 1918)
M. nigrovittatus (Malloch, 1915)
M. tener (Kieffer, 1918)
Genus Microtendipes Kieffer, 1915
M. anticus (Walker, 1848)
M. brevitarsis Brundin, 1947
M. britteni (Edwards, 1929)
M. caducus Townes, 1945
M. caelum Townes, 1945
M. chloris (Meigen, 1818)
M. confinis (Meigen, 1830)
M. diffinis (Edwards, 1929)
M. nigellus Hirvenoja, 1963
M. nitidus (Meigen, 1818)
M. pedellus (De Geer, 1776)
M. rydalensis (Edwards, 1929)
M. tarsalis (Walker, 1856)
Genus Nilothauma Kieffer, 1921
N. babiyi (Rempel, 1937)
N. bicorne (Townes, 1945)
N. mirabile (Townes, 1945) 
N. brayi (Goetghebuer, 1921)
N. hibaratertium Sasa, 1993
Genus Omisus Townes, 1945
O. caledonicus (Edwards, 1932)
O. pica Townes, 1945
Genus Pagastiella Brundin, 1949
P. orophila (Edwards, 1929)
P. ostansa (Webb, 1969)
Genus Parachironomus Lenz, 1921
P. abortivus (Malloch, 1915)
P. aculeatus (Kieffer, 1921)
P. acutus (Goetghebuer, 1936)
P. alatus (Beck, 1962)
P. arcuatus (Goetghebuer, 1919)
P. biannulatus (Stæger, 1839)
P. carinatus (Townes, 1945)
P. chaetaolus (Sublette, 1960)
P. cinctellus (Goetghebuer, 1921)
P. danicus Lehmann, 1970
P. digitalis (Edwards, 1929)
P. directus (Dendy & Sublette, 1959)
P. elodeae (Townes, 1945)
P. forceps (Townes, 1945)
P. frequens (Johannsen, 1905)
P. kuzini Shilova, 1969
P. longiforceps Kruseman, 1933
P. mauricii (Kruseman, 1933)
P. monochromus (van der Wulp, 1874)
P. paradigitalis Brundin, 1949
P. parilis (Walker, 1856)
P. pectinatellae (Dendy & Sublette, 1959)
P. potamogeti (Townes, 1945)
P. schneideri Beck & Beck, 1969
P. siljanensis Brundin, 1949
P. subalpinus (Goetghebuer, 1932)
P. sublettei (Beck, 1961)
P. swammerdami (Kruseman, 1933)
P. tenuicaudatus (Malloch, 1915)
P. varus (Goetghebuer, 1921)
P. vitiosus (Goetghebuer, 1921)
Genus Paracladopelma Harnisch, 1923
P. alphaeus (Sublette, 1960)
P. camptolabis (Kieffer, 1913)
P. doris (Townes, 1945)
P. galaptera (Townes, 1945)
P. laminatum (Kieffer, 1921)
P. loganae Beck & Beck, 1969
P. mikianum (Goetghebuer, 1937)
P. nais (Townes, 1945)
P. nereis (Townes, 1945)
P. nigritulum (Goetghebuer, 1942)
P. nixe (Townes, 1945)
P. undine (Townes, 1945)
P. winnelli Jackson, 1977
Genus Paralauterborniella Lenz, 1941
P. nigrohalteralis (Malloch, 1915)
Genus Paratendipes Kieffer, 1911
P. albimanus (Meigen, 1818)
P. basidens Townes, 1945
P. fuscitibia Sublette, 1960
P. nitidulus (Coquillett, 1901)
P. nubilus (Meigen, 1830)
P. nudisquama (Edwards, 1929)
P. plebeius (Meigen, 1818)
P. sinelobus Albu, 1980
P. subaequalis (Malloch, 1915)
P. thermophilus Townes, 1945
Genus Phaenopsectra Kieffer, 1921
P. albescens (Townes, 1945)
P. dyari (Townes, 1945)
P. flavipes (Meigen, 1818)
P. incompta (Zetterstedt, 1838)
P. obediens (Johannsen, 1905)
P. pilicellata Grodhaus, 1976
P. profusa (Townes, 1945)
P. punctipes (Wiedemann, 1817)
P. vittata (Townes, 1945)
Genus Polypedilum Kieffer, 1912
Subgenus Cerobregma Zhang & Wang 1999
P. paucisetum Zhang & Wang, 2009
Subgenus Pentapedilum Kieffer, 1913
P. botiense Oyewo & Sæther, 2008
P. scirpicola (Kieffer, 1921)
P. botosaneanui Oyewo & Sæther, 2008
P. camposense Oyewo & Sæther, 2008
P. exsectum (Kieffer, 1916)
P. intuber Oyewo & Sæther, 2008
P. nubens (Edwards, 1929)
P. reei Oyewo & Sæther, 2008
P. sordens (van der Wulp, 1874)
P. tissamaharense Oyewo & Sæther, 2008
P. tritum (Walker, 1856)
P. wittei (Freeman, 1955)
Subgenus Polypedilum Kieffer, 1912
P. acutum Kieffer, 1915
P. albicorne (Meigen, 1838)
P. albosignatum Kieffer, 1925
P. amoenum Goetghebuer, 1930
P. arundineti (Goetghebuer, 1921)
P. barboyoni Serra-Tosio, 1981
P. dudichi Berczik, 1957
P. fallax (Johannsen, 1905)
P. intermedium Albu & Botnariuc, 1966
P. laetum (Meigen, 1818)
P. lene (Becker, 1908)
P. nubeculosum (Meigen, 1804)
P. nubifer (Skuse, 1889)
P. octopunctatum (Thunberg, 1784)
P. pedestre (Meigen, 1830)
P. vanderplanki Hinton, 1951
Subgenus Tripodura Townes, 1945
P. acifer Townes, 1945
P. aegyptium Kieffer, 1925
P. akani Bjørlo, 2001
P. amplificatus Bjørlo, 2001
P. amputatum Bjørlo, 2001
P. apfelbecki (Strobl, 1900)
P. bicrenatum Kieffer, 1921
P. chelum Vårdal, 2001
P. dagombae Bjørlo, 2001
P. elongatum Albu, 1980
P. ewei Bjørlo, 2001
P. malickianum Cranston, 1989
P. ogoouense Bjørlo, 2001
P. patulum Bjørlo, 2001
P. pulchrum Albu, 1980
P. pullum (Zetterstedt, 1838)
P. quadriguttatum Kieffer, 1921
P. scalaenum (Schrank, 1803)
P. spinalveum Vårdal, 2001
P. tetracrenatum Hirvenoja, 1962
Subgenus Uresipedilum Oyewo & Sæther, 1998
P. convictum (Walker, 1856)
P. cultellatum Goetghebuer, 1931
P. marsafae Ghonaim, Ali & Osheibah, 2005
Genus Robackia Sæther, 1977
R. claviger (Townes, 1945)
R. demeijerei (Kruseman, 1933)
R. pilicauda Sæther, 1977
Genus Saetheria Jackson, 1977
S. hirta Saether, 1983
S. reissi Jackson, 1977
S. tylus (Townes, 1945)
Genus Sergentia Kieffer, 1922
S. albescens (Townes, 1945)
S. baueri Wülker, Kiknadze, Kerkis & Nevers, 1999
S. coracina (Zetterstedt, 1850)
S. prima Proviz & Proviz, 1997
Genus Stenochironomus Kieffer, 1919
S. aestivalis Townes, 1945
S. albipalpus Borkent, 1984
S. annettae Borkent, 1984
S. bisetosus Borkent, 1984
S. browni Townes, 1945
S. cinctus Townes, 1945
S. colei (Malloch, 1919)
S. fascipennis (Zetterstedt, 1838)
S. fuscipatellus Borkent, 1984
S. gibbus (Fabricius, 1794)
S. hibernicus (Edwards, 1929)
S. hilaris (Walker, 1848)
S. macateei (Malloch, 1915)
S. maculatus Borkent, 1984
S. niger Borkent, 1984
S. poecilopterus (Mitchell, 1908)
S. pulchripennis (Coquillett, 1902)
S. ranzii Rossaro, 1982
S. totifuscus Sublette, 1960
S. unictus Townes, 1945
S. woodi Borkent, 1984
Genus Stictochironomus Kieffer, 1919
S. albicrus (Townes, 1945)
S. annulicrus (Townes, 1945)
S. crassiforceps (Kieffer, 1922)
S. devinctus (Say, 1829)
S. flavicingulus (Walker, 1848)
S. lutosus (Townes, 1945)
S. maculipennis (Meigen, 1818)
S. marmoreus (Townes, 1945)
S. naevus (Mitchell, 1908)
S. palliatus (Coquillett, 1902)
S. pictulus (Meigen, 1830)
S. quagga (Townes, 1945)
S. rosenschoeldi (Zetterstedt, 1838)
S. sticticus (Fabricius, 1781)
S. unguiculatus (Malloch, 1934)
S. varius (Townes, 1945)
S. virgatus (Townes, 1945)
Genus Synendotendipes Grodhaus, 1987
S. luski Grodhaus, 1987
S. abranchius (Lenz, 1955)
S. dispar (Meigen, 1830)
S. impar (Walker, 1856)
S. lepidus (Meigen, 1830)
Genus Tribelos Townes, 1945
T. ater (Townes, 1945)
T. donatoris (Shilova, 1974)
T. fuscicorne (Malloch, 1915)
T. hesperius (Sublette, 1960)
T. intextum (Walker, 1856)
T. jucundus (Walker, 1848)
T. protextus (Townes, 1945)
T. quadripunctatus (Malloch, 1915)
Genus Xenochironomus Kieffer, 1921
X. trisetosis (Kieffer, 1922)
X. ugandae (Goetghebuer, 1936)
X. xenolabis Kieffer in Thienemann and Kieffer, 1916
Genus Zavreliella Kieffer, 1920
Z. marmorata (van der Wulp 1859)

References

Chironomidae
Nematocera tribes